Conehatta Creek is a stream in the U.S. state of Mississippi.

Conehatta is a name derived from the Choctaw language purported to mean "white polecat".

References

Rivers of Mississippi
Rivers of Newton County, Mississippi
Mississippi placenames of Native American origin